Retapamulin is a topical antibiotic developed by GlaxoSmithKline. It is the first drug in the new class of pleuromutilin antibiotics to be approved for human use.  It is marketed as an ointment under the brand names Altabax and Altargo.

Retapamulin was approved by the United States Food and Drug Administration in April 2007 for the treatment of bacterial skin infections such as impetigo.  In May 2007, retapamulin received approval in the EU from the European Medicines Agency for the same indication.

Clinical trials have demonstrated its efficacy against certain Gram-positive bacteria including MRSA.

Indications

Retapamulin is indicated for the topical treatment of impetigo due to Staphylococcus aureus (methicillin-susceptible only) or Streptococcus pyogenes.

Pharmacology

Mechanism of action
Retapamulin is an antibacterial agent, specifically a protein synthesis inhibitor. The medication selectively inhibits bacterial protein synthesis by interacting at a site on the 50S subunit of the bacterial ribosome through an interaction that differs from other antibiotics.

Pharmacokinetics
Systemic exposure following topical application through intact skin is low.

Contraindications
None yet reported.

Adverse reactions
The most common reported adverse reaction was irritation at the application site.

References

Pleuromutilin antibiotics
GSK plc brands
Secondary alcohols
Ketones
Carboxylate esters
Thioethers
Nitrogen heterocycles